Colleen Patrick-Goudreau (born March 8, 1970, in Westfield, New Jersey) is an American author, lecturer, TEDx speaker, cultural commentator, and podcaster.  Patrick-Goudreau advocates veganism as a means by which to prevent cruelty to animals.

Work
Patrick-Goudreau has written several books, including her first, The Joy of Vegan Baking in 2007 (which was re-issued for the 10-year-anniversary edition in 2017), followed by The Vegan Table: 200 Unforgettable Recipes for Entertaining about which Library Journal wrote, "Her sophisticated but mostly uncomplicated recipes will appeal to nonvegans and vegans alike." Her book Color Me Vegan is organized by color to highlight the phytochemicals in plant foods. Her book The 30-Day Vegan Challenge includes recipes and a "crash course in veganism," according to Bust. The book also addresses the health benefits of being a vegan. The 30-Day Vegan Challenge helps dispel the myth that veganism is about "deprivation and limitations," according to the Oregonian.

Her most recent book, The Joyful Vegan: How to Stay Vegan in a World That Wants You to Eat, Meat, Dairy and Eggs," was published by BenBella Books in 2020.

In 2005, Patrick-Goudreau founded the podcast Food for Thought which has been voted "Favorite Podcast" by readers of VegNews for several consecutive years. She has another podcast called ANIMALOGY, which examines the animal-related words and expressions we use and what they say about the relationship between human and non-human animals, which is also the topic of her 2020 TEDx talk. Patrick-Goudreau is also a contributor to NPR. She was featured on Vegan Mashup, a show produced for PBS. Patrick-Goudreau has appeared on national and regional TV programs, including CBS with Good Day Sacramento, and FOX where she has shared her expertise and recipes.

Bibliography

Patrick-Goudreau, Colleen (2009-06-01). The Vegan Table: 200 Unforgettable Recipes for Entertaining Every Guest at Every Occasion

Patrick-Goudreau, Colleen (2020) The Joyful Vegan: How to Stay Vegan in a World That Wants You to Eat Meat, Dairy, and Eggs. BenBella Books. 2020. ISBN 9781948836463 
Patrick-Goudreau, Colleen (2013-04-22). On Being Vegan: Reflections on a Compassionate Life

See also
Women and animal advocacy
 List of animal rights advocates

References

External links

KQED-FM's Perspectives Series Website
Colleen Patrick-Goudreau's YouTube Channel

1970 births
21st-century American women
American food writers
American podcasters
American veganism activists
American women podcasters
Chefs of vegan cuisine
Living people
Seton Hall University alumni
People from New Jersey
Vegan cookbook writers